The 2003–04 Xavier Musketeers men's basketball team represented Xavier University from Cincinnati, Ohio in the 2003–04 season. Led by head coach Thad Matta, the Musketeers finished 19–10 in the regular season, and won the Atlantic 10 tournament. In the NCAA tournament, the Musketeers put on an unexpected performance, battling all the way to the Elite Eight, eventually falling to Duke. Following the season, Matta would depart to become the head coach of Ohio State.

Roster

Tournament results

Atlantic 10 tournament
3/10/04 @ University of Dayton Arena, Dayton, OH Vs. St. Bonaventure, W, 90–64
3/11/04 @ University of Dayton Arena, Dayton, OH Vs. St. Joseph's, W, 87–67
3/12/04 @ University of Dayton Arena, Dayton, OH Vs. George Washington, W, 70–47
3/13/04 @ University of Dayton Arena, Dayton, OH Vs. Dayton, W, 58–49

NCAA tournament
3/19/04 @ TD Waterhouse Centre, Orlando, FL Vs. (10) Louisville W, 80–70 (first round)
3/21/04 @ TD Waterhouse Centre, Orlando, FL Vs. (2) Mississippi State W, 89–74 (second round)
3/26/04 @ Georgia Dome, Atlanta, GA Vs. (3) Texas W, 79–71 (Sweet Sixteen)
3/28/04 @ Georgia Dome, Atlanta, GA Vs. (1) Duke L, 66–63 (Elite Eight)

NBA draft

References

Xavier
Xavier Musketeers men's basketball seasons
Xavier